The Big Ten Player of the Year is an annual award given out at the conclusion of the Big Ten regular season to the best player in the conference as voted by a media panel and the head coaches of each team.

The Player of the Year was first awarded in 2014 and is a successor to the CCHA Player of the Year which was discontinued after the conference dissolved due to the 2013–14 NCAA conference realignment.

Award winners

Winners by school

Winners by position

See also
Big Ten Awards
List of CCHA Player of the Year
List of WCHA Player of the Year

References

Big Ten Men's Ice Hockey Player of the Year
Player of the Year